The Central District of Ferdows County is in South Khorasan province, Iran. At the National Census in 2006, its population was 38,301 in 11,299 households. The following census in 2011 counted 41,626 people in 12,482 households. At the latest census in 2016, the district had 45,523 inhabitants in 14,302 households.

References 

Ferdows County

Districts of South Khorasan Province

Populated places in South Khorasan Province

Populated places in Ferdows County